The 1904 United States presidential election in North Dakota took place on November 8, 1904. All contemporary 45 states were part of the 1904 United States presidential election. Voters chose four electors to the Electoral College, which selected the president and vice president.

North Dakota was won by the Republican nominees, incumbent President Theodore Roosevelt of New York and his running mate Charles W. Fairbanks of Indiana. The ticket won the state by a margin of 54.73%.

With 75.12% of the popular vote, North Dakota was Roosevelt's second strongest victory in terms of percentage in the popular vote after Vermont.

Results

Results by county

See also
 United States presidential elections in North Dakota

Notes

References

North Dakota
1904
1904 North Dakota elections